The 2012 FIBA Asia Under-18 Championship for Women is FIBA Asia's basketball championship for females under 18 years old. The games were held at Johor Bahru, Malaysia from September 29 to October 6. China, Japan and Korea represented FIBA in the 2013 FIBA Under-19 World Championship for Women in Lithuania.

Participating teams

Preliminary round
All times are local (UTC+08:00)

Level I

Level II

Qualifying round
Winners are promoted to Level I for the 2014 championships.

Final round

Semifinals

3rd place

Final

Final standing

Awards

References

2012
2012 in women's basketball
2012–13 in Asian basketball
2012–13 in Malaysian basketball
International women's basketball competitions hosted by Malaysia
2012 in youth sport